Louis Krages, more commonly known by his pseudonym John Winter, (2 August 1949 – 11 January 2001) was a German racing driver and businessman.

Career
Krages used the racing pseudonym "John Winter"  to prevent his family, mainly his mother, from learning about his "hobby". As John Winter, he won the 24 Hours of Le Mans in 1985 with the Porsche 956 of Joest Racing, with Klaus Ludwig and Paolo Barilla. Winter drove a single stint in the early hours of Sunday in support of his teammates. After the success and the publicity involved, his alter ego was revealed to his family when, the next day, his mother picked up a newspaper, with a picture of Krages on the rostrum.

Winter spent many seasons competing in the German Interserie series, usually racing privately entered Porsches, taking the title in 1986. Winter was also a regular entrant at Le Mans, competing 10 times at the race. Apart from his victory, his best finish was third in a Joest Racing Porsche 962 in 1988. He would also win the 24 Hours of Daytona in 1991 for Joest in the same car and also drove in the IMSA GTP until 1993 when the series ended, making the car obsolete.

In 1994, Winter, along with the team, defected to DTM, driving an Opel Calibra. In Round 10, Race 1 at AVUS, he was involved in fiery accident, in which his car disintegrated in a fireball. For the following year, driving a privateer Mercedes-Benz C-Class, he reverted to his real name, which he competed throughout the season and which was also his last.

Krages sold off his business and emigrated to Atlanta where he started up a toy business.

In 2001, suffering from problems in his business and from depression, he committed suicide in Atlanta, Georgia, by shooting himself,  at his home.

Racing record

Complete 24 Hours of Le Mans results

Note *: Not Classified because did not cover sufficient distance (70% of their winner) at the 12, 18 or 24-hour intervals.

Complete 12 Hours of Sebring results

Complete 24 Hours of Daytona results

References

External links
 Winters World

1949 births
2001 suicides
24 Hours of Daytona drivers
24 Hours of Le Mans drivers
24 Hours of Le Mans winning drivers
German expatriates in the United States
German racing drivers
Racing drivers from Atlanta
Racing drivers from Bremen (state)
Suicides by firearm in Georgia (U.S. state)
World Sportscar Championship drivers
Sportspeople from Bremen

Team Joest drivers